Anthony David FMedSci is a British neuropsychiatrist based at University College London. Previously tenured as professor of cognitive neuropsychiatry and Vice Dean at the Institute of Psychiatry, King's College London, since 2018 he has been Director, University College London, Institute of Mental Health. He is the father of Rebecca David, a Senior Campaign Manager at Influencer LTD and Michael David a junior doctor.

Education 
Professor David studied medicine at the University of Glasgow, from which he graduated in 1980. Subsequently he had trained in neurology, then psychiatry.

Career 
He has been an honorary consultant at the Maudsley Hospital, London, since 1990, and was awarded a personal chair from the Institute of Psychiatry, King's College London, in 1996.

He has a wide range of professional and research interests and has published on schizophrenia, neuropsychiatry, medically unexplained syndromes and neuroimaging – both structural and functional – and specialises in research into insight (awareness of illness) in schizophrenia and other disorders.

Professor David is a Fellow of the Royal College of Physicians, the Royal College of Psychiatrists and the Academy of Medical Sciences. He is a member of the Experimental Psychology Society and a founder member of both the British Neuropsychological Society and British Neuropsychiatry Association; he is currently Chairman of the latter. He is also an Emeritus Senior Investigator at the National Institute for Health and Care Research (NIHR).

He is co-editor of the journal Cognitive Neuropsychiatry, and has published several academic books and one for the general reader published in February 2020, 'Into the Abyss: a neuropsychiatrist's tales of troubled minds' (Published by Oneworld).

Bibliography
 
 
 
 
 David AS, Fleminger S, Kopelman M, Lovestone S, Mellers J (Eds). Lishman’s Organic Psychiatry: A Textbook of Neuropsychiatry (Revised 4th Ed). Wiley-Blackwell. 2009.

References

External links
 UCL

Neuropsychologists
Academics of King's College London
Fellows of the Academy of Medical Sciences (United Kingdom)
Fellows of the Royal College of Physicians
Living people
Year of birth missing (living people)
Scottish psychiatrists
NIHR Senior Investigators